Karalar is a village in the District of Kalecik, Ankara Province, Turkey..
Karalar is also thought to be the place of the ancient Galatian city of Blucium/Blocium/Bloukion.

References

Villages in Kalecik District